Carolina Estrada y Bascunana (born 1979) is a Spanish pianist who has a career as a soloist, recitalist and chamber music partner in Europe, Asia and Australia.

Biography
Spanish-born concert pianist Carolina Estrada, visiting Doctor of Musical Arts candidate and Teaching Assistant for the Open Academy at the Sydney Conservatorium of Music and external examiner at  University of New England, founder and director of Iberia Classics, in demand in international festivals and conservatories.
Estrada developed a particular passion for the music of her native land when she moved to live abroad after she graduated with the highest degree given in piano performance in Spain at the Conservatorium of Barcelona by the time she was 18 years old. Her endeavors on behalf of Spanish music have been acknowledged by several governmental institutions in different countries. The Spanish Ministry for Education and Culture, the Catalan Government and the University of Barcelona Foundation Agusti Pere i Pons have actively sponsored her Hispanic-themed investigations, gaining her Bachelor (2003) and Master of Music (2005) degrees with cum laude at the Conservatorium van Amsterdam in 2005. In the Netherlands, Carolina Estrada received the Nuffic Scholarship from the Dutch Government for a year of specialization with legendary pianist Laszlo Simon (former student of Claudio Arrau) at the Universität der Künste Udk Berlin. 
From 2005 to 2009, Carolina Estrada served as piano lecturer at Reus Conservatorium of Music in Spain and at the Sultan Qaboos University in Middle East.
Currently based in Bern (Switzerland) as visiting scholar in the Hochschule der Künste Bern.

Distinctions
Since 2012, the University of Sydney honors the pianist with two faculty merit postgraduate award to support her doctoral research: the prestigious George Henderson Award and the Katheleen & Allison Short Scholarship.  Her investigation on Enrique Granados’ piano works supervised by Bernadette Harvey and Natalia Ricci at the University of Sydney and receives privileged insights from Albert Attenelle and the Marshall Academy professors Maria Teresa Monteys and Carlota Garriga, the last three remaining students of Frank Marshall and direct inheritors of this piano tradition in Barcelona
Grant holder of numerous international awards and prizes, Carolina's career achieved major cultural acclaim across Europe with recently honored with The Grand Cross of the Most Illustrious Order of Humanitarian Merit and The European Gold Cross bestowed by the Agrupación Española de Fomento Europeo – in recognition of the valuable promotion of Hispanic Arts and Culture.
Carolina actively contributes to Australian cultural life and her activities to promote Spanish music in Australia are widely supported by the Spanish Embassy, the Consulate General of Spain and the Cervantes Institute.

References

[1] Festival References
https://web.archive.org/web/20140903182546/http://www.encuentrosespanoles.com/#!featured-artists/c1a36
https://web.archive.org/web/20150206130223/http://www.barcelonafestivalofsong.com/en/?option=com_tz_portfolio&view=portfolio&Itemid=136&lang=en
http://sidney.cervantes.es/FichasCultura/Ficha91109_21_2.htm

[2] Conferences
http://music.sydney.edu.au/events/lectures-and-presentations
http://www.fimte.org/#!symposium/ctc7
http://conservatorium.unimelb.edu.au/assets/Spanish_abstracts.pdf
https://web.archive.org/web/20140903182546/http://www.encuentrosespanoles.com/#!lecturepresentations/c2203

[3] Concerts
http://music.sydney.edu.au/events/chamber-works-encuentros-espaoles-a-spanish-feast-23-09-2014
https://web.archive.org/web/20150206122245/http://www.ahwbn.org/info2share/
https://tickets.cityrecitalhall.com/single/EventDetail.aspx?p=1818
https://web.archive.org/web/20150206124649/http://events.mosman.nsw.gov.au/events/821/sounds-of-my-land
http://www.limelightmagazine.com.au/Event/375320,enrique-granados-embracing-romanticism-and-spanish-folklore.aspx?eid=35&edate=20140410
https://web.archive.org/web/20140903232503/https://events.com/Sydney-New-South-Wales/trending/Enrique-Granados-Embracing-Romanticism-and-Spanish-folklor?eid=5329ad240f131322010bfb93

[4] Press  
https://web.archive.org/web/20140903213206/http://www.australianlatinopress.com.br/2014/06/interview-with-carolina-estrada-concert.html
http://www.accioncultural.es/es/encuentro_musica_espa_ola_y_su_nexo_formas_danza
http://www.gourmettraveller.com.au/gt-wine/wine-news/2014/2/gt-wine-music-wine-matching-event/
http://www.thefreelibrary.com/Encuentros+Espanoles+Featured+Spanish+Classical+Pianist+Carolina...-a0348932269

[5] Radio interviews
Onda Cero – by Isabel Gemio
https://www.youtube.com/watch?v=EjSMn0AWXvk

SBS Australia – by Carlos Sanchez
http://www.sbs.com.au/podcasts/yourlanguage/spanish/episode/297458/Spanish-Encounters

Catalunya Musica "Notes de clàssica" (min45)-with Albert Torrens
http://www.catmusica.cat/diferit_cm.htm?origenId=762726&tipus=audio&mainContent=http%3A%2F%2Fwww.catmusica.cat%2Fpcatmusica%2FcmItem.jsp%3Fitem%3Dprograma%26emissora%3Dcm%26idint%3D1137

SBS – by Silvia Rosas – Melbourne
http://www.sbs.com.au/yourlanguage/spanish/highlight/page/id/292673/t/Encuentros-Espa%C3%B1oles-celebrates-the-nexus-of-Spanish-music-and-dance/in/english

Catalunya Musica "Notes de clàssica" (min45)-with Albert Torrens
http://www.catmusica.cat/diferit_cc.htm?origenId=650301&tipus=audio&mainContent=http%3A%2F%2Fwww.catmusica.cat%2Fsearcher%2Fcatmusica%2Fresultats.jsp%3FtextBusca%3Dnotes+de+%26pagina%3D1%26emissora%3Dcc%26hiAdvanced%3D1
 
[6] Distinctions
http://www.aefe.es/
http://meritohumanitario.blogspot.com.es/

External links
Official Website
Works by Carolina Estrada

Spanish women pianists
Conservatorium van Amsterdam alumni
1979 births
Living people
Musicians from Barcelona
Spanish classical pianists
21st-century classical pianists
21st-century women pianists